Ottavio Alessi (1 January 1919 - 28 April 1978) was an Italian screenwriter, producer and film director.

Life and career 
Born in  Cammarata, Province of Agrigento, Alessi entered the film industry in 1940 as an assistant director. In 1945 he started an intense career as a screenwriter, alternating between genre films and art films and collaborating with Pietro Germi, Franco Rossi, Folco Quilici and Luciano Salce, among others. He also directed two films in the 1960s.

Selected filmography 
Director and screenwriter
 What Ever Happened to Baby Toto? (1964) (a parody of What Ever Happened to Baby Jane?).
 Top Sensation (1969)

Screenwriter
 The Testimony (1946)
 Amici per la pelle (1955)
 A Woman Alone (1956)
 Juke box urli d'amore (1959)
 Wild Cats on the Beach (1959)
 The Mongols (1961)
 Charge of the Black Lancers (1962)
 La ragazzola (1965)
 Bali (1970)
 Emanuelle in Bangkok (1976)
 La Bidonata (1977) 
 Emanuelle in America (1977)
 The Precarious Bank Teller (1980)

References

External links 
 

1919 births
1978 deaths
Italian film directors
20th-century Italian screenwriters
People from the Province of Agrigento
Italian male screenwriters
Film people from Sicily
20th-century Italian male writers
Italian parodists
Comedy film directors
Parody film directors